Newberry is a city in Newberry County, South Carolina, United States, in the Piedmont  northwest of Columbia. The charter was adopted in 1894. The population was 10,277 at the 2010 census. It is the county seat of Newberry County; at one time it was called Newberry Courthouse.

Newberry became a city in 1976, but did not report the change to the Census Bureau for more than twenty-five years.  As a result, the city was listed as a town in the 2000 census.

It is the home of Newberry College, a private liberal-arts college affiliated with the Evangelical Lutheran Church in America.

Geography 
Newberry is located at  (34.277655, -81.616560).

According to the United States Census Bureau, the town had a total area of 6.6 square miles (17.0 km2), all land.

Demographics

2020 census

As of the 2020 United States census, there were 10,691 people, 4,047 households, and 2,233 families residing in the city.

2000 census

As of the 2000 census, there were 10,580 people, 3,970 households, and 2,528 families residing in the town. The population density was 1,609.2 people per square mile (621.8/km2). There were 4,388 housing units at an average density of 667.4 per square mile (257.9/km2). The racial makeup of the town was 52.85% White, 41.36% African American, 0.47% Native American, 0.60% Asian, 0.12% Pacific Islander, 2.88% from other races, and 1.70% from two or more races. Hispanic or Latino of any race were 9.49% of the population.

There were 3,970 households, out of which 29.7% had children under the age of 18 living with them, 36.5% were married couples living together, 22.3% had a female householder with no husband present, and 36.3% were non-families. 31.7% of all households were made up of individuals, and 15.9% had someone living alone who was 65 years of age or older. The average household size was 2.42 and the average family size was 2.97.

In the town the population was spread out, with 23.3% under the age of 18, 14.9% from 18 to 24, 25.5% from 25 to 44, 18.6% from 45 to 64, and 17.6% who were 65 years of age or older. The median age was 34 years. For every 100 females, there were 86.3 males. For every 100 females age 18 and over, there were 81.6 males.

The median income for a household in the town was $27,064, and the median income for a family was $33,490. Males had a median income of $28,681 versus $20,887 for females. The per capita income for the town was $14,389. About 23.8% of families and 28.0% of the population were below the poverty line, including 39.9% of those under age 18 and 21.0% of those age 65 or over.

History

European settlers (primarily German, Scots-Irish, and English) began arriving in great numbers in the 1750s. Newberry County was formed from the Ninety-Six District in 1785. Because of its central location, the town of Newberry was chosen in 1789 as the county seat for Newberry County, which was part of an extensive area of cotton plantations. County and town politics were dominated by planters. By the coming of the railroad in 1851, Newberry had become a thriving trade center. This remained the case until the 1860s.

During the American Civil War, Newberry College was used as a hospital for Confederate and later Union troops. The historic Newberry Court House wasn't burned by William Tecumseh Sherman's troops as he swept through the South.

Violent racial incidents hit all over the country as part of the 1919 Red Summer. On July 24, 1919 there was the attempted lynching of Elisha Harper of Newberry. Harper was sent to jail for insulting a 14-year-old girl.

The Boundary Street-Newberry Cotton Mills Historic District, Burton House, Caldwell Street Historic District, Coateswood, College Street Historic District, Cousins House, Hannah Rosenwald School, Harrington Street Historic District, Francis B. Higgins House, Main Street Historic District, George Mower House, Newberry College Historic District, Newberry County Memorial Hospital, Newberry Historic District, Newberry Opera House, Oakland Mill, Old Courthouse, Ike Reighley House, Summer Brothers Stores, Timberhouse, Vincent Street Historic District, Wells Japanese Garden, Osborne Wells House, and West Boundary Street Historic District are listed on the National Register of Historic Places.

Education
Newberry has a public library, a branch of the Newberry County Library System.

Notable people
Coleman Livingston Blease (1868–1942), politician of the Democratic Party
Eugene Satterwhite Blease, former Chief Justice of the South Carolina Supreme Court
Trevor Booker (b 1987), former professional NBA player for Washington Wizards
Carl "CJ" Edwards Jr. (b 1991), professional baseball pitcher for the Washington Nationals
Jordan Hill (b 1987), former professional basketball player for Los Angeles Lakers
Mickey Livingston (1914–1983), professional baseball catcher for Chicago Cubs
Billy O'Dell (1933-2018), professional baseball player for San Francisco Giants
Ralph Rowe (1924–1996), baseball player, manager and coach
Richard Sligh (1944–2008), professional football player for the Oakland Raiders, tallest player in pro football history
Henry McNeal Turner (1834–1915), minister, politician, bishop of the African Methodist Episcopal Church (AME), and Georgia state legislator
Reggie Taylor (January 12, 1977), a professional baseball outfielder

References

External links

 City of Newberry
 The Newberry Observer
Newberry Oktoberfest
 Visit Newberry, SC
 Newberry College
 Newberry Historical and Museum Society 
 Newberry Opera House
 The Ritz Theater
 

 
Cities in Newberry County, South Carolina
Cities in South Carolina
County seats in South Carolina
Columbia metropolitan area (South Carolina)